Mario Saint-Amand (born ) is a Canadian actor from Quebec.

Biography 
Mario Saint-Amand began his career in 1987 at the Denise-Pelletier Theater in Le Mariage de Figaro (The Marriage of Figaro) alongside Guy Nadon. Saint-Amand made the transition from opera to theatre by taking the role of Harlequin in Marivaux's play Le Jeu de l'Amour et du Hasard (The Game of Love and chance). Throughout the early 1990s, he appeared in a plays directed by André Brassard, Dominique Champagne, and André Montmorency.

Saint-Amand began his film career in the late 1980s. His first starring role was in the 1991 movie 'Love-Moi' directed by Marcel Simard. He starred in several TV series including Scoop, Networks and more recently, in Grande Ourse (Big bear), directed by Patrice Sauvé.

At the 1994 Gemini Awards, Saint-Amand won the "Best Performance by an Actor in a Featured Supporting Role" award for his notable portrayal of a man with AIDS in a guest appearance on the TV series L'Amour avec un grand A (Love with a Capital L).

In 2004, he founded a company named Les Films de la Dune (The Movies of the Dune) with the aim of producing his own projects. He also founded the Ciné Cabarouette to introduce elementary school students to the art of film making. He continued to appear in movies throughout the 2000s, notably as Gérald "Gerry" Boulet in Gerry, a biopic about the lead singer of the French Canadian blues band Offenbach.

Saint-Amand began working as a screenwriter with the encouragement of André Forcier. He started with the movie Coteau rouge (red knife), in which he also played the character Henri Blanchard. Afterwards, he played forL'enfer, c'est moi (Hell, it's me), the biographical story of Actress Néfertarie Bélizaire's childhood sexual abuse at the hands of her uncle in Haiti. He also played in "Pas de Mal À Une Mouche" (No Harm to a Fly) inspired by the Maryse Latandresse novel of the same name.

In 2012, he started his own band "Le Saint-Amand Blues" and released five mini-albums. He produced two more albums in 2013 and 2014. In these albums, he paid homage to the songwriters of Offenbach and Gerry Boulet. These albums included 11 songs and 11 short stories that are part of the show he gave throughout Quebec during spring of 2013.

In 2019, Mario Saint-Amand was a student at Laval University and an assistant researcher at the Quebec Addiction Rehabilitation Center and has been a spokesperson for Maisons Péladeau since 2014.

Filmography 
 1988: animateur Émission AZ, au Canal Famille, dans le rôle d'Antoine Zénon.
 1990: Watatatow : Simon Laurin
 1991: Love-Moi : Jacques
 1992: L'Automne sauvage : Antoine
 1995: Radio Enfer : Guylain Ti-Guy Tremblay
 1995: Scoop: Robert Jonhson
 1995: Les grands procès (Affaire Cordélia Viau) : Sam Parslow
 1996: Karmina : Pierre Boutin
 1998: La Part des anges : Philippe Bernard
 1998: Escape : Prisoner
 1998: Réseaux: Michel Valois
 1999: Opération Tango : Sergent Davila
 2000: Family Pack (Que faisaient les femmes pendant que l'homme marchait sur la Lune ?) : Bob
 2003: Grande Ourse : Pierre Lamy
 2005: L'Héritière de Grande Ourse: Pierre Lamy
 2005: Emilio : The Cat & Emilio grown-up
 2007: Le Symptôme : Capitaine Colorado
 2007: Truffe : Mineur
 2008: Blind Spot (Lucidité passagère) : Mathieu
 2009: Je me souviens: Rock
 2010: Coteau rouge : Henri
 2011: Gerry : Gerry Boulet
 2016: District 31: Michel David

Awards and nominations

Awards 
He won a Gemini Award in 1994 in the category "Best Performance in a Supporting Role" in all dramatic categories for his character Jean Pierre in "Missionary AIDS" written and directed by Janette Bertrand.

Nominations 
His first nomination took place at the presentation of Prix Gémeaux in 1992 following the interpretation of his character, Alain, suffering from schizophrenia in L’amour c’est pas assez (Love is not enough). It was still under the direction of Janette Bertrand at the time, which is when he won the award for "Best Male Performance in a Supporting Role" for his memorable composition of the character of Jean-Pierre suffering from AIDS in the Dramatic "Missionary AIDS". In 1994, his character Simon Laurin in the popular series Watatatow lead him to a third nomination in the category Best performance drama show or drama series. While still under the direction of Janette Bertrand, he gets re-nominated again in 1996 when he gets offered the role of Louis Côté in Un Peu, Beaucoup, À la Folie (A Little, Much, To the Folly) that he will play alongside Marcel Leboeuf and Macha Limonchik.

First nominated for the 2012 Prix Jutra for Henri's character from André Forcier's film Coteau rouge and his interpretation of the legendary singer of the band Offenbach, Gérald Gerry Boulet, in the movie Gerry.

References

1968 births
Living people
Canadian male film actors
Canadian male television actors
Canadian male voice actors
French Quebecers
Male actors from Quebec
People from Sept-Îles, Quebec